Shari L. Gallop is a marine environmental scientist and an academic at the University of Waikato, New Zealand.

Biography 
Gallop grew up in the Bay of Plenty region; she was born in Whakatāne and raised in Kawerau and Manawahe. She is New Zealand Māori, of Ngāti Maru (on her father's side) and Te Rarawa (on her mother's side) iwi. 

She attended Edgecumbe College and the University of Waikato, where she completed a bachelor's and a master's degree in science. Her thesis was on rip currents at Tairua and Muriwai beaches. She completed a PhD at the University of Western Australia in Perth, Australia, studying rocky reefs and their impact on coastal erosion and stability. After graduation, she lectured and carried out research at the University of Southampton in the United Kingdom and Macquarie University in Sydney, Australia.

In 2020, Gallop was awarded the L’Oréal/UNESCO For Women in Science Award for her research into restoring estuaries.

References 

Academic staff of the University of Waikato
Living people
Te Rarawa people
University of Western Australia alumni
Academics of the University of Southampton
Ngāti Maru (Hauraki)
People from Whakatāne
New Zealand women scientists
Year of birth missing (living people)
University of Waikato alumni
Academic staff of Macquarie University
New Zealand oceanographers
New Zealand environmentalists